Ruslan Faritovich Ayukin (born 9 February 1994) is a Russian football player who plays for FC KAMAZ Naberezhnye Chelny.

Club career
He made his debut in the Russian Football National League for FC KAMAZ Naberezhnye Chelny on 17 July 2021 in a game against FC Tekstilshchik Ivanovo.

References

External links
 
 
 Profile by Russian Football National League

1994 births
Living people
Russian footballers
Association football defenders
FC KAMAZ Naberezhnye Chelny players
Russian Second League players
Russian First League players